Heikampen Peak is a peak at the southeast end of the Robin Heights in the Sverdrup Mountains of Queen Maud Land, Antarctica. It was photographed from the air by the Third German Antarctic Expedition (1938–39). It was mapped by Norwegian cartographers from surveys and air photos by the Norwegian–British–Swedish Antarctic Expedition (1949–52) from and air photos by the Norwegian expedition (1958–59) and named Heikampen (the upland mountain top).

References

Mountains of Queen Maud Land
Princess Martha Coast